Melilla la Vieja ("Old Melilla") is the name of a large fortress which stands immediately to the north of the port in Melilla, one of Spain's Plazas de soberanía on the north African coast. Built during the 16th and 17th centuries, much of the fortress has been restored in recent years.

The fortress contains many of Melilla's most important historical sites, among them an archaeological museum, a military museum, the Church of the Conception, and a series of caves and tunnels in use since Phoenician times.

References
Hardy, P., Vorhees, M., and Edsall, H. (2005). Morocco. Footscray, VIC: Lonely Planet.

Buildings and structures in Melilla
History of Melilla